Sreedevi Kakkad is an Indian writer in Malayalam language.

Early life

Sreedevi Kakkad was born in Karalmanna, Palakkad in the Indian state of Kerala. Her parents were Keezhe Narippatta Sankara Narayanan Namboothiri and Neeli Antharjanam. She studied at Karalmanna and Cherpulasshery. Her intermediate study was in Victoria College, Palakkad.

She married N. N. Kakkad, a Malayalam writer on 26 April 1955. They resided in Kozhikode.

Career 

She was a proofreader in Malayalam dailies such as Deshabhimani and Mathrubhumi. She retired from Mathrubhumi in 1995. She wrote journals articles. She presented poems, dramas, etc. in Akashavani.

She served as the president of Deshaposhini library in Kozhikode. She is an active member in the library. She served as the president and Secretary of Deshaposhini Mahila Samajam.

Major works

She wrote books including Ardramee Dhanumasaravil about her husband N.N. Kakkad, Vamapakshathu Oral, biography of Vamanan Nambootiri, a relative.

References

1935 births
Living people
Malayalam-language writers
20th-century Indian women writers
21st-century Indian women writers
Women writers from Kerala